Abdul Ahad Azad (1903 – 1948) was a Kashmiri poet born in village ranger tehsil Chadoora of  Budgam district. He is often referred to as the "Keats of Kashmir". He was influenced by Kashmiri ghazals of Rasul Mir and Mahmud Gami.He was one of the pioneers of the modernist movement. He belonged to the Dar tribe of Kashmir. His father's name was Sultan Dar. Kuleat e Azad and Haraam e Saba are two of his books.

His work is still famous among Kashmiris and he has written many well known Kashmiri songs. He mostly dedicated his poetry to God. He wanted through his poems to create sensibility and to develop consciousness among people. He reminded people of what they were made for and what they have been doing, they have forgotten the actual purpose they were made for. He wanted people to wake up from the fanciful slumber and do something for the benefit of mankind before it is too late. He was born in Ranger, Chadoora.

References

1903 births
1948 deaths
Kashmiri poets
20th-century Indian poets
Indian male poets
20th-century Indian male writers